The Netherlands Football League Championship 1952–1953 was contested by 56 teams participating in four divisions. The national champion would be determined by a play-off featuring the winners of each division of the Netherlands. RCH won this year's championship by beating FC Eindhoven, Sparta Rotterdam and Vitesse Arnhem.

New entrants
Eerste Klasse A:
Moving in from other divisions: AFC Ajax, DOS, NEC Nijmegen, RCH, Sneek Wit Zwart, VSV, FC Wageningen and Zwolsche Boys
Promoted from 2nd Division: Heracles
Eerste Klasse B:
Moving in from other divisions: AGOVV Apeldoorn, DWS, Elinkwijk, Go Ahead, HVV 't Gooi, HFC Haarlem and sc Heerenveen
Promoted from 2nd Division: Stormvogels
Eerste Klasse C:
Moving in from other divisions: Brabantia, Emma, HBS Craeyenhout, LONGA, Sparta Rotterdam, Theole and VVV Venlo
Promoted from 2nd Division: SBV Excelsior
Eerste Klasse D:
Moving in from other divisions: ADO Den Haag, Bleijerheide, DHC Delft, FC Eindhoven, Feijenoord, NAC and RBC Roosendaal
Promoted from 2nd Division: TEC Tiel

Divisions

Eerste Klasse A

Eerste Klasse B

Eerste Klasse C

Eerste Klasse D

Championship play-off

Play-off 

|}
RCH won the championship.

References
RSSSF Netherlands Football League Championships 1898-1954

Netherlands Football League Championship seasons
1952–53 in Dutch football
Neth